The BlackBerry Motion is an Android smartphone manufactured by TCL Corporation under the brand name of BlackBerry Mobile. It was launched on 9 October 2017 in Dubai at the Gitex Technology Week, and first went on sale in the United Arab Emirates and Saudi Arabia on 22 October 2017.

Specifications

Hardware
The BlackBerry Motion is a mid-range phone. It is powered by the Qualcomm Snapdragon 625 processor, backed by 4 GB of RAM and 32 GB flash memory. It has a 12 MP rear camera with a f/2.0 aperture, capable of recording 4K video. The front camera is an 8 MP sensor capable of recording 1080p video.

The Motion sports a 5.5-inch display with a Full HD (1080p) resolution. It has a large 4,000 mAh battery with Qualcomm QuickCharge 3.0. Additional features include IP67 water and dust resistance, a 3.5mm headphone jack, a USB-C charging and data transfer port, and a front-mounted fingerprint reader.

Software
BlackBerry Motion originally shipped with Android 7.1 Nougat.

However, during August 2018, Blackberry started to roll out Android 8.1 Oreo updates.

References

Android (operating system) devices
Mobile phones introduced in 2017
Motion
Discontinued smartphones